Club swinging (or Indian clubs) was an artistic gymnastics event held at the Summer Olympics.  It was only held twice: 1904 and 1932.  In 1932 only four competitors from two nations competed.

Medalists

Team medal counts

References 

Club swinging